Half-Life 2: Episode Two is a 2007 first-person shooter game developed and published by Valve. Following Episode One (2006), it is the second of two shorter episodic games that continue the story of Half-Life 2 (2004). Players control Gordon Freeman, who travels through the mountains surrounding City 17 to a resistance base with his ally Alyx Vance. Like previous games in the series, Episode Two combines shooting, puzzle-solving and narrative elements, but adds expansive environments and less linear sequences.

Episode Two was released on 10 October, 2007, for Windows on Valve's distribution service Steam, and as a part of The Orange Box, a compilation of Valve games for Xbox 360 and PlayStation 3. The PlayStation version was produced by Electronic Arts. Episode Two received positive reviews.

Half-Life 2: Episode Three was announced for Christmas 2007, but was canceled as Valve abandoned episodic development. In 2020, after canceling several further Half-Life projects, Valve released Half-Life: Alyx.

Gameplay
As with previous Half-Life games, Episode Two is played in the first person as Gordon Freeman against transhuman troops, known as the Combine, and other hostile alien creatures. Levels are linear but add a more open environment, consisting of puzzles and first-person shooter game-play. Sequences involving vehicles are interspersed throughout the game, breaking up moments of combat.

One of the focal points of Episode Two was meant to be increased use of vehicles in open areas. However, the game retains its original linear style until the final battle. Episode Two has more puzzles than Episode One, including the biggest physics puzzle yet in the series—a damaged bridge. As in the previous two games, Episode Two features numerous "achievements" (similar to PlayStation 3's Trophies and Xbox Live's Achievements) for carrying out certain tasks. Some are essential to game progress, such as helping fight off an antlion invasion, or defeating the first Hunters. Others are optional tricks or feats the player can perform, such as killing a Combine soldier with their own grenade or running down a certain number of enemies with the car.

Enemies
Episode Two featured a new Hunter enemy, which had just been seen briefly in a recorded message in Episode One. The Hunter serves as one of the most dangerous enemies within the game and as means of emotional development for Alyx Vance. The Hunter is a powerful and resilient enemy which players must often run from while seeking a means to fight back; Episode Twos environments are designed with this in mind.

Erik Johnson, the game's project lead, states that the Hunters are "big and impressive, but they can go anywhere the player can go", as the player can encounter them both indoors and outdoors. Ted Backman, senior artist for Valve, talks about how the Hunter can express emotions, being a somewhat non-human character. "We want the Hunter to be able to express nervousness or aggression, [to show you] whether it's aggressive, hurt, or mad." Hunters are very aggressive and they tend to operate in packs, but can also be found supporting other Combine troops. Late in the game, they can be found escorting Striders, using their flechette guns to protect the Striders that the player is trying to attack.

Hunters primarily attack the player by bracing themselves and firing bursts from their flechette cannon. Four flechettes can vaporize an ordinary human soldier. If they do not strike a living target, the flechettes charge up for several seconds and then explode, dealing minor damage to everything nearby. Hunters may also conduct a charging attack or strike with their legs if the player gets too close. Hunters are vulnerable to all weapons, but to compensate, are still quite resilient, making explosives and the pulse rifle's charged energy ball the most attractive options. Objects thrown with the gravity gun are also effective, especially if the player catches some of their flechettes with the object before hurling it. In outdoor environments, they can be run over with a vehicle.

Weapons

Episode Two features no additions to Gordon Freeman's weapons inventory. Instead, Valve chose to further explore uses for the gravity gun, with which the player can pick up and throw large objects. They introduced more varied Gravity Gun "ammunition", such as logs, flares, and half-height butane tanks, which are easier to aim than full-size fuel drums.

Near the end of the game, the player uses "Magnusson Devices", which designer Dario Casali described as a "sticky bomb that you fire at a Strider's underbelly that will draw power from the Strider's internal power source". The player uses the gravity gun to attach the bombs to tripodal enemy Striders; the bombs detonate when fired upon with any other of the player's weapons, instantly destroying the target. The Hunter escorts prioritize them as targets, either destroying them in the player's grasp or shooting already-attached ones off.

Vehicles
Large sections of the game feature a car which resembles a gutted-and-rebuilt 1969 Dodge Charger. It appears to have been tuned for performance. A radar system is installed later in the game, allowing the player to locate Rebel supply caches. In the final battle, a rear-mounted storage rack for Magnusson Devices is added and the radar is adjusted to track enemies and Magnusson Device dispensers. A homing unit is also installed so the player can quickly locate the car in the chaos of the final battle via a readout in the Hazardous Environment suit.

Plot
The Combine, a multidimensional empire which has enslaved Earth, has used the destruction of their Citadel to open a massive portal. This will allow them to summon reinforcements and destroy the Resistance. In the mountains outside City 17, Resistance fighters Gordon Freeman and Alyx Vance escape the wreckage of the train they used to escape the city. At an old transmission station, they establish communication with resistance scientists Dr. Kleiner and Eli Vance at the White Forest base. They learn that the Resistance may be able to close the portal using a copy of a Combine transmission Alyx is carrying.

At an abandoned mine, Alyx is critically wounded by a Combine Hunter. A vortigaunt leads them to an underground Resistance shelter. Gordon recovers larval extract from a nearby antlion colony, necessary for the vortigaunts to heal Alyx. While the vortigaunts are preoccupied healing her, the mysterious G-Man contacts Gordon and hints at Alyx's importance to his plans; he revealed that he saved her life at the Black Mesa Research Facility despite objections from an unspecified third party. He instructs the unconscious Alyx to tell her father to "prepare for unforeseen consequences".

After Alyx recovers, she and Gordon proceed in an old Resistance vehicle, battling Combine troops and surviving an encounter with a Combine Advisor, a high-ranking Combine alien with powerful psychic abilities. At White Forest, they are reunited with Dr. Kleiner, Eli, and Alyx's pet robot Dog. Gordon is introduced to the egotistical Dr. Arne Magnusson. The scientists are preparing a rocket which they plan to use with the Combine portal code and the satellite array launched by Gordon at Black Mesa to close the Combine portal.

After Gordon fends off a Combine attack on the base, Alyx gives Dr. Kleiner the message from Judith Mossman recovered at the Citadel. It contains footage and the coordinates of the Borealis, an Aperture Science research vessel built within an icebreaker similar to the USCGC Healy, Kleiner explains, vanished along with part of the surrounding drydock. Kleiner insists that it should be used to aid the Resistance effort, while Eli counters that it is impossible to control and must be destroyed. They agree that Alyx and Gordon will travel to the Borealis and attempt to find Mossman.

Alyx unconsciously delivers the G-Man's message to her father, troubling him. Alone with Gordon, Eli reveals that it was the G-Man who provided the test sample that caused the Black Mesa incident, and that he whispered the same warning to him as Gordon entered the test chamber. He promises to explain more after the portal is closed.

While the scientists prepare the rocket, White Forest comes under attack by the Combine. Gordon destroys the attacking Striders using experimental explosive charges created by Magnusson. The scientists launch the rocket and close the portal, trapping Combine forces on Earth. Alyx and Gordon prepare to leave for the Borealis and Eli warns Gordon about the ship's "cargo". The three head to a hangar, intending to board a helicopter, but two Advisors burst into the hangar and restrain them. As Eli tries to free them, he is killed by one of the Advisors. As the second one prepares to kill Alyx, Dog bursts in and chases the Advisors away. Alyx, sobbing, clutches her father's body.

Development
Episode Two was the second in a planned trilogy of shorter episodic games that would continue the story of Half-Life 2 (2004). It was developed simultaneously with Episode One (2006) by a team led by David Speyrer. This schedule of simultaneous development aided them in streamlining the story between the two games to create an immersive story. The technology used was the same for both games, allowing the development teams to quickly fix any technical problems that might arise from either game; this happened often because of the multi-platform release. The team originally planned the ending to feature a comical sequence with Lamarr, Kleiner's pet headcrab, floating in space outside the rocket Gordon launches into space; however, Valve president Gabe Newell requested killing off a major character to create a cliffhanger for Episode Three.

An announcement was made on July 13, 2006, stating that Episode Two would be released on Xbox 360 and PlayStation 3 in addition to the PC, where previous iterations of the series separated. Valve handled the development for the PC and Xbox 360, while Electronic Arts (EA) worked on the PlayStation 3 version. It was announced on September 7, 2007, that the PlayStation 3 version of the game would be delayed because the EA studio behind the game was in the United Kingdom, away from Valve's development team, and therefore lagged behind in its schedule. According to Valve's marketing director, Doug Lombardi, the Xbox 360, PlayStation 3, and PC versions would be identical in functionality and performance.

An audio commentary is also featured, as in Episode One and Lost Coast. Tony Todd replaced Louis Gossett Jr. as the voice of the Vortigaunts.

Reception

Half-Life 2: Episode Two received an average score of 90.68% based on 22 reviews on the review aggregator GameRankings. On Metacritic, it has an average score of 90 out of 100 based on 21 reviews, indicating "universal acclaim".

Dan Adams of IGN rated the game 9.4 out of 10 and praised its improved visuals and expansive environments, but cited the short six-hour length as a drawback. He said: "Any way you look at it, Episode Two stands out, even among the Half-Life series, as something special ... a burly experience packed into roughly six hours or so that offers up all the diversity, level design, and thoughtful gameplay we've known while making sure to propel the story forward and leave us wanting more." Bit-tech.net awarded the game a 10 out of 10 score, citing approval of how the story turns and the introduction of side stories and new characters. 1UP.com said it was "vivid, emotionally engaging, and virtually unsurpassed". PC Gamer UK felt Episode Two was "the most sumptuous chapter of the Half-Life saga, and by a country mile". The New York Times enjoyed the gameplay, saying that battles "often require as much ingenuity as they do fast reflexes".

Computer and Video Games said that although the Source engine was dated, the "wonderful art design and the odd bit of technical spit-shine ensure that Episode Two [...] doesn't lose any of its wow factor". They also noticed that the game "goes about fixing a lot of the niggling complaints we had about Episode One," applauding the open forests and rocky hills.

The New York Times wrote that "while it sows a few seeds for the final episode of the trilogy, the game lacks the driving force of the previous episode". GameSpy felt it was less consistent than its predecessors, and that the opening segments were "arguably the weakest".

Sequels 
Half-Life 2: Episode Three was scheduled for release by Christmas 2007, but was canceled as Valve abandoned episodic development and were developing a new game engine, Source 2. After canceling several further Half-Life games, Valve released Half-Life: Alyx in 2020.

References

External links

 Official Half-Life 2: Episode Two website
 

2007 video games
First-person shooters
Episodic video games
E
PlayStation 3 games
Science fiction video games
Valve Corporation games
Linux games
MacOS games
Windows games
Xbox 360 games
Source (game engine) games
Video games with commentaries
Video games about zombies
Single-player video games
Video game sequels
Dystopian video games
Abandoned buildings and structures in fiction
Video games developed in the United States
Video games scored by Kelly Bailey
Video games set in the 2020s
Video games set in Eastern Europe
Video games using Havok
Laboratories in fiction
Fiction about rebellions